Çardaklı is a town (belde) in the Atkaracalar District, Çankırı Province, Turkey. Its population is 2,079 (2021). The town consists of 5 quarters: Bozkuş, Cumhuriyet, Nevzatayaz, Hürriyet and Mustafakemal.

References

Populated places in Atkaracalar District